The Lady Mother is a Caroline era stage play, a tragicomedy generally attributed to Henry Glapthorne, and dating from the middle 1630s. Never printed in its own era, the play survived in a manuscript marked as a theatre prompt-book, revealing significant details about the stage practice of its time.

The Lady Mother was licensed for performance by the office the Master of the Revels on 15 October 1635. It was originally staged by the King's Revels Men at the Salisbury Court Theatre, and was acted for the royal court at Whitehall Palace that year.

Yet the play was not published for more than two centuries; it was first issued in 1883 by editor A. H. Bullen in his Old English Plays Vol. 2. Bullen first assigned the play to Glapthorne. The Malone Society produced a modern text in 1959, edited by Arthur Brown. The drama survived the centuries in manuscript form, part of MS. Egerton 1994 (folios 186–211) in the collection of the British Library. In the MS., the entrances and exits are consistently marked, the entrances in advance so that the prompter could cue the actors; the necessary properties are also marked, in advance of their needs. Cues for music and dancing are also included – all the details that the prompter would have needed to guide the performance. The MS. displays its license on the final page. The MS. is a scribal copy, and shows repeated revision; it reveals Glapthorne working with his scribe to shape the final text. The Revels office (specifically William Blagrave, the assistant of the Master, Sir Henry Herbert) demanded some changes in the text, and several lines are crossed out, to be omitted from performance.

F. G. Fleay speculated that The Lady Mother was an alternative title for The Noble Trial, a Glapthorne play that was among those in the collection of John Warburton that were destroyed by fire.

Bullen argued that Glapthorne's play showed the influence of the drama of James Shirley, a dominant figure in Caroline drama. The play's plot involves the marital fortunes of Lady Marlove (The title character) and her daughters Belisea and Clariana. One of her suitors is a foolish old country knight, Sir Geffrey – a figure who provides the play's lighter comic element. The more serious element of the plot involves Lady Marlove and her son facing execution for a supposed murder. The play concludes in a "death masque" in which a personified Death invokes despair and the Furies, only to be dispelled by Hymen, the god of marriage. It is then revealed that Thurston, the supposedly dead man, is alive and married to Clariana; happy ending.

Notes

References
 Bawcutt, N. W., ed. The Control and Censorship of Caroline Drama: The Records of Sir Henry Herbert, Master of the Revels 1623–73. Oxford, Oxford University Press, 1996.
 Drew-Bear, Annette. Painted Faces on the Renaissance Stage: The Moral Significance of Face-Painting Conventions. Lewisburg, PA, Bucknell University Press, 1994.
 Ioppolo, Grace. Dramatists and Their Manuscripts in the Age of Shakespeare, Jonson, Middleton and Heywood. London, Routledge, 2006.
 Long, William B. "'Precious Few:' English Manuscript Playbooks," in: A Companion to Shakespeare, edited by David Scott Kasdan; London, Blackwell, 1999; pp. 414–33.
 Stevens, David. "The Staging of Plays at the Salisbury Court Theatre, 1630–1642," Theatre Journal Vol. 31 No. 4 (December 1979), pp. 511–25.

English Renaissance plays
1635 plays
Plays in manuscript